Paraptecticus is a genus of flies in the family Stratiomyidae.

Species
Paraptecticus viduatus Grünberg, 1915

References

Stratiomyidae
Brachycera genera
Taxa named by Karl Grünberg
Monotypic Brachycera genera
Diptera of Africa